Dmitriy Ilinikh ( born 31 January 1987) is a Russian volleyball player, who competes for Belogorie Belogorod and the national team. in 2011 he was included in the application for the World League. Participated in 13 matches, the tournament ended with victory for the Russian team, gaining 50 points in them. In 2011, as a part of the national team,  Ilinykh won the World League 2011 and 2013. He has competed at the 2012 Summer Olympics, where Russia won the gold medal in the final against Brazil.

References 

1987 births
Living people
Sportspeople from Sochi
Russian men's volleyball players
Volleyball players at the 2012 Summer Olympics
Olympic volleyball players of Russia
Olympic gold medalists for Russia
Olympic medalists in volleyball
Medalists at the 2012 Summer Olympics
Universiade gold medalists for Russia
Universiade medalists in volleyball
PAOK V.C. players